Shahrdari Urmia Football Club is an Iranian football club based in Urmia, West Azerbaijan who play in Iran Football's 2nd Division.

Football clubs in Iran
Sport in Urmia